William Joyce Sewell (December 6, 1835 – December 27, 1901) was an Irish-American Republican Party politician, merchant, and military officer who served as a U.S. Senator from New Jersey for two non-consecutive terms from 1881 to 1887 and 1895 until his death in 1901.

Sewell was born in Castlebar, County Mayo, Ireland.  He immigrated to the United States in 1851 where he worked in the merchant industry in Chicago, Illinois before moving to Camden, New Jersey in 1860. He served as an officer in the Union Army during the American Civil War, receiving the Medal of Honor for his actions at the Battle of Chancellorsville. He was also a postbellum state senator and U.S. Senator. The community of Sewell, New Jersey is named for him.

Personal details
He was married with four children, two daughters and two sons. He immigrated from Ireland when he was a young boy.

Civil War
Sewell began his Civil War service as a Captain with the 5th New Jersey Volunteer Infantry on August 28, 1861. He was promoted to lieutenant colonel on July 7, 1862 and colonel on January 6, 1863.  Sewell commanded a brigade at the Battle of Chancellorsville, Virginia, where he was wounded.  He was awarded the Medal of Honor in 1896 for his actions.  Sewell was the only officer to be awarded the Medal of Honor while in command of a New Jersey regiment. 
  
Sewell was severely wounded again at the Battle of Gettysburg, Pennsylvania, while commanding his unit along Emmitsburg Road on the second day of the battle, July 2, 1863.  His wounds forced him from the field for a significant period.  He resigned on July 6, 1863 and returned on October 1, 1864.  On his return he was given command of the 38th New Jersey Volunteer Infantry, but his wounds eventually caused him to end his Civil War field service.  He was reassigned as commander of Fort Powhatan in the Department of Virginia from January to April 1865. Sewell was mustered out of the volunteers on June 30, 1865.

In recognition of Sewell's service, on January 13, 1866, President Andrew Johnson nominated Sewell for appointment to the brevet grade of brigadier general, United States Volunteers for "gallant and meritorious services at the Battle of Chancellorsville, Va.," to rank from March 13, 1865 and the U.S. Senate confirmed the appointment on March 12, 1866. On July 18, 1868, President Andrew Johnson nominated Sewell for appointment to the brevet grade of major general of volunteers for "gallant and meritorious services during the war," to rank from March 13, 1865 and the U.S. Senate confirmed the appointment on July 23, 1868.

Politics
After the war, Sewell worked in the railroad industry in New Jersey before being elected to the state senate, serving from 1872 until 1881, and as the senate's president in 1876 from 1879 to 1880. Subsequently, he was elected to the United States Senate as a Republican and served from March 4, 1881 to March 3, 1887.  During this period he chaired
the Committee on Enrolled Bills (Forty-seventh Congress and Forty-eighth Congress),
the Committee on Military Affairs (Forty-ninth Congress), and
the Committee on the Library (Forty-ninth Congress).

He held the post as chairman of the New Jersey delegation at the Republican National Convention five times. He also was President of the West Jersey & Seashore Rail road Company, a post he held until his death.

Sewell served as one of the national commissioners for New Jersey to the World's Columbian Exposition in Chicago in 1893, commanded the Second Brigade of the National Guard of New Jersey, and was appointed a member of the Board of Managers of the National Home for Disabled Volunteer Soldiers. He was an unsuccessful candidate for reelection in 1887, 1889 and 1893 but was again elected to the United States Senate in 1895, serving from 1895 until 1901.  During this term he chaired the Committee on Enrolled Bills (Fifty-fourth Congress through Fifty-seventh Congress).

Death
Sewell died of complications from heart disease and diabetes at 9:40am on December 27, 1901, at age 66, in his home at Camden, New Jersey. His vacant Senate seat was filled by Prudential Insurance founder John F. Dryden. Sewell received full Military Honors at the funeral by both State National Guard and Federal Military. During the funeral, official state business was suspended in Camden as a token of respect for his service. He was buried in Harleigh Cemetery, in Camden, New Jersey, in the Spring Grove Section, Lot 75. His grave is marked by a cross designed by sculptor Alexander Stirling Calder.

Legacy
In 2005 a government issue Medal of Honor marker was erected on his grave site.  He is one of three Civil War Union Brevet Generals interred in Harleigh, the others being Colonel George C. Burling of the 6th New Jersey Volunteer Infantry and Colonel Timothy C. Moore of the 34th New Jersey Volunteer Infantry.

Medal of Honor citation

Rank and Organization:
Colonel, 5th New Jersey Infantry. Place and Date: At Chancellorsville, Va., May 3, 1863. Entered Service At: Camden, N.J. Born: December 6, 1835, Castlebar, Ireland. Date of Issue: March 25, 1896.

Citation:
Assuming command of a brigade, he rallied around his colors a mass of men from other regiments and fought these troops with great brilliancy through several hours of desperate conflict, remaining in command though wounded and inspiring them by his presence and the gallantry of his personal example.

See also

List of Medal of Honor recipients
List of American Civil War Medal of Honor recipients: Q–S
List of United States senators born outside the United States
List of United States Congress members who died in office (1900–49)

Notes

References
 
Eicher, John H., & Eicher, David J., Civil War High Commands, Stanford University Press, 2001, .

External links

 Memorial addresses on the life and character of William J. Sewell, late a representative from New Jersey delivered in the House of Representatives and Senate frontispiece 1903

1835 births
1901 deaths
19th-century Irish people
Irish soldiers in the United States Army
People from County Mayo
United States Army Medal of Honor recipients
Irish-born Medal of Honor recipients
Republican Party New Jersey state senators
People of New Jersey in the American Civil War
Politicians from Camden, New Jersey
Union Army colonels
Republican Party United States senators from New Jersey
Presidents of the New Jersey Senate
Irish emigrants to the United States (before 1923)
American Civil War recipients of the Medal of Honor
Burials at Harleigh Cemetery, Camden
People from Castlebar
19th-century American politicians